This is a list of Sri Lanka Cricket lists, an article with a collection of lists relating to the Sri Lankan Cricket team.

Teams

Stadiums

Cricketers

Player statistics

Batting
 List of international cricket centuries by Aravinda de Silva
 List of international cricket centuries by Kumar Sangakkara
 List of international cricket centuries by Mahela Jayawardene
 List of international cricket centuries by Marvan Atapattu
 List of international cricket centuries by Sanath Jayasuriya
 List of international cricket centuries by Tillakaratne Dilshan

Bowling
 List of international cricket five-wicket hauls by Muttiah Muralitharan
 List of international cricket five-wicket hauls by Rangana Herath

Records

Test
 List of Sri Lankan Test cricket records
 100 Runs Test Cricket Partnerships by Sri Lanka

One-day International
 List of Sri Lanka One Day International cricket records

Twenty20
 List of Sri Lanka Twenty20 International cricket records

By ground

centuries
 List of international cricket centuries at the Colombo Cricket Club Ground
 List of international cricket centuries at the Paikiasothy Saravanamuttu Stadium
 List of international cricket centuries at the R. Premadasa Stadium
 List of international cricket centuries at the Sinhalese Sports Club Ground
 List of international cricket centuries at the Tyronne Fernando Stadium

five-wicket hauls
List of international cricket five-wicket hauls at the Mahinda Rajapaksa International Stadium 
List of international cricket five-wicket hauls at the Paikiasothy Saravanamuttu Stadium 
List of international cricket five-wicket hauls at the Sinhalese Sports Club Ground

See also
 2009 attack on the Sri Lanka national cricket team

External links
 Cricinfo

Sri Lanka in international cricket
Cricket